The 2013 San Marino and Rimini Riviera motorcycle Grand Prix was the thirteenth round of the 2013 MotoGP season. It was held at the Misano World Circuit Marco Simoncelli in Misano Adriatico on 15 September 2013.

Classification

MotoGP

Moto2

Moto3

Championship standings after the race (MotoGP)
Below are the standings for the top five riders and constructors after round thirteen has concluded.

Riders' Championship standings

Constructors' Championship standings

 Note: Only the top five positions are included for both sets of standings.

References

San Marino and Rimini Riviera motorcycle Grand Prix
San Marino
San Marino and Rimini
San Marino and Rimini Riviera motorcycle Grand Prix